Minuscule 342 (in the Gregory-Aland numbering), ε 314 (Soden), is a Greek minuscule manuscript of the New Testament, on parchment. Palaeographically it has been assigned to the 13th century. 
It has marginalia.

Description 

The codex contains a complete text of the four Gospels on 300 parchment leaves. It is written in one column per page, in 21 lines per page.

There is also a division according to the smaller Ammonian Sections (in Mark 234 Sections – the last in 16:9), with references to the Eusebian Canons.

Text 

The Greek text of the codex is a representative of the Byzantine text-type. Aland placed it in Category V.
It was not examined by the Claremont Profile Method.

History 

The manuscript was examined by Passino, Scholz, and Burgon. It was added to the list of New Testament manuscripts by Scholz (1794-1852).
C. R. Gregory saw it in 1886.

The manuscript is currently housed at the Turin National University Library (B. V. 24) in Turin.

See also 

 List of New Testament minuscules
 Biblical manuscript
 Textual criticism

References

Further reading 

 Giuseppe Pasino, Codices manuscript Bibliothecae Regii Taurini Athenaei, Turin 1742, Teil 2.

External links 
 

Greek New Testament minuscules
13th-century biblical manuscripts